Road Show is a live album by bandleader and pianist Stan Kenton and His Orchestra with vocalists June Christy and The Four Freshmen featuring a concert recorded at the Purdue University in 1959 and released on the Capitol label as a double album.

Reception

The Allmusic review by Kenneth M. Cassidy noted "this is a fine live recording from 1959. June Christy is a bit below par due to a cold on the day of the recording".

Track listing
All compositions by Stan Kenton except where noted.
 "Artistry in Rhythm" (Stan Kenton) – 3:15
 "Stompin' at the Savoy" (Edgar Sampson, Benny Goodman, Chick Webb, Andy Razaf) – 3:35
 "My Old Flame" (Arthur Johnston, Sam Coslow) – 4:56
 "The Big Chase" (Marty Paich) – 9:30
 "I Want to Be Happy" (Vincent Youmans, Irving Caesar) – 1:05
 "It's a Most Unusual Day" (Jimmy McHugh, Harold Adamson) – 2:38
 "Midnight Sun" (Sonny Burke, Lionel Hampton, Johnny Mercer) – 3:53
 "Kissing Bug" (Billy Strayhorn, Rex Stewart, Joya Sherrill) – 2:46 
 "Bewitched, Bothered and Bewildered" (Richard Rodgers, Lorenz Hart) – 5:28
 "How High the Moon" (Morgan Lewis, Nancy Hamilton) – 3:09
 "Day In, Day Out" (Rube Bloom, Johnny Mercer) – 2:39
 "Angel Eyes" (Matt Dennis, Earl Brent) – 4:00
 "I'm Always Chasing Rainbows" (Harry Carroll, Joseph McCarthy) – 6:00
 "Paper Doll" (Johnny S. Black) – 3:17
 "Them There Eyes" (Maceo Pinkard, Doris Tauber, William Tracey) – 5:38
 "Love for Sale" (Cole Porter) – 3:40
 "September Song" (Kurt Weill, Maxwell Anderson) – 4:33
 "Walkin' Shoes" (Gerry Mulligan) – 3:20
 "The Peanut Vendor" (Moisés Simons) – 5:05
 "Artistry in Rhythm" (Kenton) – 1:42

Personnel
Stan Kenton – piano, conductor (tracks 1–5, 7, 8, 10–12 & 16–20)
June Christy – vocals (tracks 5–10 & 17–19)
The Four Freshmen – vocal group (tracks 11–15 & 17–19)
Ken Albers
Don Barbour
Ross Barbour
Bob Flanigan
Bud Brisbois, Rolf Ericson, Bill Mathieu, Roger Middleton, Dalton Smith  – trumpet (tracks 1–5, 7, 8, 10–12 & 16–20)
Kent Larsen, Archie LeCoque, Don Sebesky – trombone (tracks 1–5, 7, 8, 10–12 & 16–20)
Jim Amlotte, Bob Knight – bass trombone (tracks 1–5, 7, 8, 10–12 & 16–20)
Charlie Mariano  – alto saxophone (tracks 1–5, 7, 8, 10–12 & 16–20)
Ronnie Rubin, Bill Trujillo – tenor saxophone (tracks 1–5, 7, 8, 10–12 & 16–20)
Marvin Holladay, Jack Nimitz – baritone saxophone (tracks 1–5, 7, 8, 10–12 & 16–20)
Joe Castro – piano (tracks 6 & 10)
Pete Chevily – bass (tracks 1–12 & 16–20)
Jimmy Campbell – drums (tracks 1–12 & 16–20)
Mike Pacheco – Cuban drums (tracks 1–5, 7, 8, 10–12 & 16–20)

References

Stan Kenton albums
June Christy albums
The Four Freshmen albums
1960 live albums
Capitol Records live albums
Albums conducted by Stan Kenton
Collaborative albums
Albums produced by Lee Gillette
Albums produced by John Palladino
Albums produced by Bill Wagner